François-Élie Vincent (20 June 1708 – 28 March 1790) was a French painter of portrait miniatures.

He was born in Geneva. He moved to Paris where he painted and taught. Among his pupils were his son, François-André Vincent, a notable painter and a leader of the neoclassical movement, and Adélaïde Labille-Guiard, one of the first women to enter the Académie royale de peinture et de sculpture in Paris.

References

1708 births
1790 deaths
18th-century artists from the Republic of Geneva
Portrait miniaturists
18th-century French painters